The Mangatewai River is a river of the Hawke's Bay Region of New Zealand's North Island.

The Mangatewai River should not be confused with its southern neighbour, the Mangatewainui River.

See also
List of rivers of New Zealand

References

Rivers of the Hawke's Bay Region